In Economics, joint product is a product that results jointly with other products from processing a common input; this common process is also called joint production. A joint product can be the output of a process with fixed or variable proportions.

Examples 
 The processing of crude oil can result in the joint products naphtha, gasoline, jet fuel, kerosene, diesel, heavy fuel oil and asphalt, as well as other petrochemical derivatives. The refinery process has variable proportions depending on the distilling temperatures and cracking intensity.
 Cogeneration delivers the joint products of heat and power; trigeneration provides cold, heat and power. With extraction steam turbines, cogeneration has variable proportions; with an internal combustion engine the proportions of heat and power are fixed.
 In a blast furnace, joint products are pig iron, slag and blast furnace gas. The iron is a precursor of steel, the slag can be sold as construction material, and the gas is used to reheat Cowper stoves. With variable process parameters of the iron smelting, the proportions are slightly variable.
 The chloralkali process, one of the basic processes in the chemical industry, is the electrolysis of sodium chloride (common salt) providing the joint products  chlorine, sodium hydroxide and hydrogen. Due to the molar relation in the chemical equation, the proportions are fixed.

See also 
 Joint product pricing

References 

Production and manufacturing